Charles C. Cratsenberg (August 1, 1903 – January 27, 1995), of Illinois and Arizona, was a dedicated stamp collector who served philately by active participation in major philatelic organizations.

Philatelic activity
Cratsenberg was an active participant in local stamp collecting clubs. He served the Trans Mississippi Philatelic Society as president and held offices in the Iowa and Illinois Federations of Stamp Clubs. At the national level, Cratsenberg served as president of the American Philatelic Society (APS), from 1957 to 1961, and helped coordinate and manage the transitional changes that occurred within the society caused by its move to State College, Pennsylvania. He also helped found the APS Writers Unit 30, and was named to the "Committee of Five" to investigate and track down counterfeiter Raoul Ch. De Thuin, an effort that was successful and described in the 1974 APS publication, The Yucatán Affair.

Honors and awards
In 1961 Charles C. Cratsenberg received the Luff Award in 1961 for Outstanding Service to the Society, and, inn 1962, he was elected to the Arizona State Philatelic Hall of Fame. Because of his dedicated service to the American Philatelic Society, he was named to the American Philatelic Society Hall of Fame in 1996.

See also
Philately

References
Charles C. Cratsenberg

American philatelists
People from Illinois
People from Arizona
1903 births
1995 deaths
American Philatelic Society